Bhakti Park is a monorail station on Line 1 of the Mumbai Monorail serving the Bhakti Park housing colony in the Wadala area of Mumbai, India. It was opened to the public on 2 February 2014, as part of the first phase of Line 1.

The station will also be an interchange for the upcoming fourth line of the Mumbai Metro. In 2018, an affidavit was filed in the Bombay High Courtstating that the station was among four that did not receive the requisite clearances from the Mumbai Fire Brigade and Brihanmumbai Municipal Corporation.

References

Mumbai Monorail stations
Railway stations in India opened in 2014